Aganisia is a small South American genus in the orchid family (Orchidaceae), subfamily Epidendroideae.

The genus was named after the Greek word ‘agnos’ (gratitude), perhaps referring to the sweet scent of its flowers.

These dwarf, epiphytic climbing orchids occur in mountainous or savanna forests and alongside rivers in Trinidad, Brazil, Colombia, Venezuela, Guyana, French Guiana, Suriname and Peru.

Aganisia produce pseudobulbs and small flowers produced from a creeping rhizome. These flowers generally reach 4 cm in width. Their color varies from a rose-tinted violet to a blue-tinted violet. The flower has a short column foot and an elongate stipe.

They are rarely cultivated.

Species 
Four species are currently recognized (May 2014):

 Aganisia cyanea (Lindl.) Rchb.f. - Blue orchid  - Venezuela, Colombia, Peru, Brazil 
 Aganisia fimbriata Rchb.f. - Brazil, Venezuela, Colombia, Peru, Guyana, Suriname 
 Aganisia pulchella Lindl. - Trinidad, French Guiana, Suriname, Guyana, Venezuela, Brazil 
 Aganisia rosariana (V.P.Castro & J.B.F.Silva) F.Barros & L.R.S.Guim.  - Brazil (Rondônia)

Intergeneric Hybrids 
 xDownsara. = Aganisia x Batemannia x Otostylis x Zygosepalum
 xHamelwellsara = Aganisia x Batemannianax Otostylis x Zygopetalum x Zygosepalum
 xMauriceara =  Aganisia x Batemanniana x Pabstia x Promenaea x Otostylis x Zygopetalum x Zygosepalum
 xOtonisia =  Aganisia x Otostylis
 xZygonisia  = Aganisia x Zygopetalum

References

External links 

Acacallis cyanea - Orchid, Acacallis cyanea is one of the most beautiful of the Zygopetalinae
Royal Horticultural Society: Registration of Orchids
Missouri Botanical Garden

 
Zygopetalinae genera
Epiphytic orchids
Flora of South America
Flora of Trinidad and Tobago